The Eastern Cooperative Oncology Group (ECOG) began in 1955 as one of the first publicly funded cooperative groups to perform multi-center clinical trials for cancer research. A cooperative group in oncology constitutes a large network of private and public medical institutions developing   protocols for cancer treatments. Institutional members include universities, medical centers, governments, and other cooperative groups. Research results are often provided through scientific publications, but the group also works closely with the pharmaceutical industry to test potential cancer drugs.

According to ECOG's website, there are "more than 90 active clinical trials in all types of adult malignancies. Annual accrual is 6,000 patients, with more than 20,000 patients in follow-up."

ECOG's coordinating center is based in Boston, Massachusetts while its Group Chair's office is located in Philadelphia, Pennsylvania.

References

External links
 

Cancer organizations based in the United States
Medical research institutes in the United States
Organizations established in 1955
1955 establishments in the United States
Clinical trial organizations
Medical and health organizations based in Massachusetts